Marvin Friedrich (born 13 December 1995) is a German professional footballer who plays as a centre back for Bundesliga club Borussia Mönchengladbach.

Club career
In 2011, Friedrich joined the Schalke 04's youth academy. He made his Bundesliga debut on 13 September 2014 against Borussia Mönchengladbach in a 4–1 away defeat.

On 17 June 2016, it was announced that Friedrich had joined Augsburg on a three-year deal.

In January 2018, Friedrich moved to 2. Bundesliga side Union Berlin on a -year contract until summer 2021. Augsburg secured an option re-sign Friedrich and, in May 2019, it was announced that FC Augsburg had redeemed the buy-back option for €1 million only to sell him back to Union Berlin for financial aspects. On 5 July 2019, Friedrich returned to Union Berlin in a permanent deal on a three-year contract for €2.5 million.

On 11 January 2022, Friedrich signed for Borussia Mönchengladbach.

International career
Friedrich made his debut for the Germany u19 team on 16 April 2014 in a 5–2 win over the Belgium u19 team in which Friedrich came on in the 60th minute for Anthony Syhre and within six minutes Friedrich celebrated his debut goal for the Germany u19 team. Friedrich was in the Germany U19 team for the 2014 UEFA European Under-19 Championship in Hungary and made two brief appearances. After a 1–0 win over Portugal u19 team in the final, Friedrich became European champion.

Style of play
Friedrich is a versatile defender, Friedrich is primarily deployed in the defensive positions of centre-back and right-back or left-back, and he is technically and physically similar to Benedikt Höwedes. Friedrich's strength, running, and tactical intelligence on the football pitch, are just some of his qualities.

Career statistics

References

External links
 

1995 births
Living people
Sportspeople from Kassel
German footballers
Footballers from Hesse
Association football central defenders
Germany youth international footballers
Bundesliga players
2. Bundesliga players
FC Schalke 04 players
FC Schalke 04 II players
FC Augsburg players
1. FC Union Berlin players
Borussia Mönchengladbach players